Martine Le Moignan MBE (born 28 October 1962, Guernsey, Channel Islands) is a former professional squash player, who was one of the game's leading players in the 1980s and early-1990s. In international competition, she represented England.

Le Moignan won the World Open in 1989, defeating Susan Devoy of New Zealand in the final 4–9, 9–4, 10–8, 10–8. She was also runner-up at the World Open in 1990, and runner-up at the British Open in 1985, 1989 and 1992. Le Moignan won four consecutive World Team Championships from 1985-1990.

Le Moignan was coached by Reg Harbour at the beginning of her career. She was appointed a Member of the Order of the British Empire (MBE) in the 1990 New Year Honours for services to squash.

World Open

Finals: 2 (1 title, 1 runner-up)

World Team Championships

Finals: 6 (4 titles, 2 runner-up)

British Open

Finals: 3 (0 title, 3 runners-up)

References

External links
 

English female squash players

Guernsey squash players
Guernsey sportswomen
Members of the Order of the British Empire
1962 births
Living people